Maksat Dzhakybaliev ; born 18 February 2000) is a Kyrgyzstani footballer who currently plays for FC Kaganat.

Club career

Hougang United

He join the club on loan from Turkey club, Sivasspor u-21.

He made his debut against Tampines Rovers on 17 October 2020.

Career statistics

Club

Notes

References

2000 births
Living people
Kyrgyzstani footballers
Kyrgyzstani expatriate footballers
Association football defenders
Singapore Premier League players
Balestier Khalsa FC players
Kyrgyzstani expatriate sportspeople in Singapore
Expatriate footballers in Singapore